s Lands Hospitaal is a hospital in Paramaribo, Suriname. The hospital started as a military hospital when it was established in 1760. In 1934, the hospital was transformed into a general hospital and renamed 's Lands Hospitaal. The hospital has specialized in neonatology and pediatrics. In 2015, an Intensive Care Unit was opened.

See also
Academic Hospital Paramaribo, another university hospital of Paramaribo;
Sint Vincentius Hospital, a Catholic hospital in Paramaribo;
Diakonessenhuis, a Protestant hospital in Paramaribo.

References

External links

Hospitals in Suriname
Hospitals established in the 1760s
Military hospitals